The 2009 Bank of Beijing China Open was a professional ranking snooker tournament that took place between 30 March and 5 April 2009 at the Beijing University Students' Gymnasium in Beijing, China. The event was sponsored by Bank of Beijing and Hyundai.

The defending champion was Stephen Maguire, but he lost in the first round 0–5 against Dave Harold.

Peter Ebdon won in the final 10–8 against John Higgins.

Prize fund
The breakdown of prize money for this year is shown below:

Winner: £52,000
Runner-Up: £25,000
Semi-Finalists: £9,000
Quarter-Finalists: £5,775
Last 16: £5,000
Last 32: £3,450
Last 48: £2,050
Last 64: £1,400

Stage one highest break: £500
Stage two highest break: £2,000

Stage one maximum break: £1,000
Stage two maximum break: £20,000

Wildcard round

These matches were played in Beijing on March 30.

Main draw

Final

Qualifying

These matches took place between 21 and 24 January 2009 at the Pontin's Centre, Prestatyn, Wales.

Century breaks

Qualifying stage centuries

 142, 109  Stuart Pettman
 138  Patrick Wallace
 131  Scott MacKenzie
 127  Joe Swail
 124  Stuart Bingham
 123, 109  Ricky Walden
 121  Liu Chuang
 110  Atthasit Mahitthi

 109  Jamie Cope
 109, 103  Jin Long
 104  Kuldesh Johal
 103  Martin Gould
 103  Michael Judge
 100  David Gilbert
 100  Judd Trump

Televised stage centuries

 140, 132, 121, 110, 103  John Higgins
 140, 128, 105  Ricky Walden
 138, 108, 100  Peter Ebdon
 134, 118  Gerard Greene
 132  Mark Allen
 129, 108  Stephen Hendry
 127  Ding Junhui
 124, 104  Ronnie O'Sullivan

 115  Dave Harold
 114  Shaun Murphy
 109, 101, 100  Graeme Dott
 108  Xiao Guodong
 105  Tian Pengfei
 105  Mark Selby
 100  Judd Trump

References

China Open (snooker)
China Open
Snooker Open
Sports competitions in Beijing